Recado is the fourth album by singer-songwriter Vince Bell. It was released on May 8, 2007. According to Bell:  "Recado is a collection of messages that wind like a long dirt road through the years of my writing. There's the first song I wrote after moving to Austin, written on a whore-house piano that writer-friendly Strait Music sold me for 150 bucks—delivered. There's one about taking chances in Berkeley while I collaborated with Bob Neuwirth on my first album, Phoenix.  Two are from the high desert south of Santa Fe, New Mexico where you can see for a hundred miles.  I also chose a masterful one from Townes.  Altogether they portray at least a couple of lifetimes of lyric like I like it, with music that says the same thing."

Track listing
"Isla"
"Give Chance a Chance"
"Where the Late Night Crowd Is Led"
"Ranch Land"
"Done That Too"
"Gypsy"
"Caribbe"
"Labor of Love"
"Mr. Mudd and Mr. Gold"
"Even Cowboys Get the Blues"
"Goodnight Lullaby"

Song credits
"Isla," "Ranch Land," "Done That Too," "Gypsy": Vince Bell, Vince Bell Publishing (SESAC), administered by Bug Music
"Give Chance a Chance," "Caribbe": Vince Bell, Bug Music (BMI)/Vince Bell Publishing (SESAC), administered by Bug Music
"Where the Late Night Crowd is Led," "Labor of Love," "Even Cowboys Get the Blues," "Goodnight Lullaby": Vince Bell, Bug Music (BMI)/Black Coffee Music (BMI), administered by Bug Music
"Mr. Mudd and Mr. Gold": Townes Van Zandt, TVZ Music (ASCAP)/Katie Belle Music (ASCAP)/Will Van Zandt Publishing (ASCAP), administered by Bug Music

Album Facts
Because "message," the English translation of the album's title, appeared on the back cover of the CD, the album was sometimes mistakenly identified in reviews as Message.

Personnel
Vince Bell -Pawless v2 model mesquite dreadnought acoustic guitar and vocals
Bill Browder – piano and acoustic guitar
Cam King – electric guitar, electric bass, keyboards, autoharp, harmonica, percussion
Freddie Steady Krc – percussion
Tammy Rogers – fiddle and mandolin
Michael Woody – mandolin

Production
Producer: Cam King
Executive producers: Sarah Wrightson and Vince Bell
Mixing and mastering: Cam "El Mixador" King and Layton DePenning at Elmo's Lab, Manchaca, Texas
Recording locations: The Real Deal, Santa Fe, New Mexico; DynaMike Studios, Nashville, Tennessee; Bowie Street Recorders, Fredericksburg, Texas; Elmo's Lab, Manchaca, Texas; SteadyGo Recording, Austin, Texas

External links
 Vince Bell official site
  Vince Bell's MySpace page
 Daryn Kagan profiles Vince Bell
 Vince Bell's artist bio at the H.A.A.M. (Houston Association of Acoustic Musicians) website
 “Introducing the Vince Bell "Handmade Hardtop Acoustic Dreadnaught Line”: lutier Vince Pawless describes custom-making a guitar for Vince Bell
 Elmo's Lab Recording Studio

2007 albums
Vince Bell albums